Thyria may refer to:

Thyria (city), an ancient Greek city
Thyria (moth), was a genus of moths of the family Noctuidae. It is now considered a synonym of Argyrosticta
Thyria (river),  a tributary of the Sambre in Belgium